The Sunset Trail is a 1917 American silent drama film directed by George Melford, written by Beulah Marie Dix and Alice McIver, and starring Vivian Martin, Henry A. Barrows, William Elmer, Harrison Ford, Charles Ogle, and Carmen Phillips. The picture was released on October 13, 1917, by Paramount Pictures.

Plot

Cast 
 Henry A. Barrows as Vernon Treloar
 William Elmer as Price Lovel
 Harrison Ford as Kirk Levington
 Vivian Martin as Bess Aiken
 Charles Ogle as Judd Aiken
 Carmen Phillips as Camilla Aiken

Reception
Like many American films of the time, The Sunset Trail was subject to cuts by city and state film censorship boards. The Chicago Board of Censors ordered cut one intertitle, "I must see you alone," and all love scenes between the married woman and man except for the last one.

Preservation status
The film is preserved at the George Eastman House Motion Picture Collection.

References

External links 

 
 
 

1917 films
1910s English-language films
Silent American drama films
1917 drama films
Paramount Pictures films
Films directed by George Melford
American black-and-white films
American silent feature films
1910s American films